Sentara Healthcare is a not-for-profit healthcare organization serving Virginia and northeastern North Carolina. It is based in Norfolk, Virginia and offers services in 12 acute care hospitals, with 3,739 beds, 853,000 members in its health plan, 10 nursing centers, and three assisted living facilities across the two states. Sentara Healthcare operates its own managed-care plan in Optima Health which covers 450,000 subscribers in the region. It also operates four medical groups.

History

Although Sentara Healthcare as a corporation was founded in 1972, its origins date back to 1888. That year, the Norfolk Women's Christian Association founded the 25-bed hospital known as the Retreat for the Sick in Norfolk, Virginia. Ten years after its foundation, the hospital was renamed to the Norfolk Protestant Hospital. In 1936, its name was changed again to the Norfolk General Hospital.

Norfolk General was the site of the region's first successful open-heart surgery in 1967. Another Norfolk hospital called the Sarah Leigh Hospital was founded with 35 beds in 1903 by Dr. Southgate Leigh. At the time, the Leigh Hospital was a state-of-the-art facility built with rounded corners, a fire suppression system, and basic air handling. 

Norfolk General and Sarah Leigh Hospital formed the foundation of Sentara Healthcare in 1972. Indeed, that year, Norfolk General Hospital and Leigh Memorial Hospital merged to form a joint corporation called Medical Center Hospitals. One of the first projects undertaken by the merged entity was the construction of a new Leigh Memorial Hospital. The 250-bed hospital was completed in 1977, relocating from its original home in the Ghent neighborhood to its present location on Kempsville Road. In 1981, Elizabeth Carr, the nation's first baby born using the in vitro fertilization procedure, was delivered at Norfolk General Hospital.

On February 25, 1982, the organization deployed its Nightingale air ambulance for the first time. It was the first hospital-based air ambulance in the state of Virginia. It has successfully completed over 20,000 missions from Sentara Norfolk General Hospital as of 2017. In 1983, the organization's name was changed from Medical Center Hospitals to Alliance Health System. In 1984, it began offering the Optima Health Plan HMO. In 1987, the corporation adopted the name "Sentara Health System" (later "Sentara Healthcare"). The names of its properties were also rebranded, including the two main hospitals, and multiple medical care facilities.

In 1988, Hampton General Hospital joined the system. The following year, doctors at Sentara Norfolk General Hospital performed the region's first successful heart transplant. In 1991, Sentara purchased the Humana Bayside Hospital in Virginia Beach, renaming it Sentara Bayside Hospital. In 1996, Sentara and the Williamsburg Community Hospital entered into a formal partnership which saw Sentara taking a 49% equity stake in the hospital. Sentara eventually took over full ownership of the hospital in 2002, and it later adopted the name, Sentara Williamsburg Regional Medical Center.

In 1998, Sentara merged with Tidewater Health Care, a Virginia Beach-based healthcare system that operated Virginia Beach General Hospital. The organization became known as Sentara Healthcare at that time. Also that year, the Sentara Foundation was created as the charitable arm of the organization, providing grants to other local healthcare entities. In 2000, Sentara Norfolk General Hospital and other Sentara hospitals became the first in the nation to employ "eICU" services in which doctors remotely monitor patients in the ICU. In 2002, the five-story Sentara CarePlex Hospital was completed and replaced the Sentara Hampton General Hospital in Hampton.

In 2005, Sentara announced a deal to merge with Obici Health System, which operated Louise Obici Memorial Hospital in Suffolk. That hospital was renamed "Sentara Obici Hospital." The deal was finalized in early 2006. That year, the 300,000 square-foot Sentara Heart Hospital was completed in Norfolk. In 2011, the Sentara Princess Anne Hospital (a joint venture with competing health system, Bon Secours) was opened in Virginia Beach. At that time, the Sentara Bayside Hospital was renamed "Sentara Independence" and became an outpatient campus and nerve center for Sentara IT operations.

Sentara continued adding hospitals to its network in the intervening years, including Potomac Hospital in Woodbridge (2009), Rockingham Memorial Hospital in Harrisonburg (2010), Martha Jefferson Memorial Hospital in Charlottesville (2011), Halifax Regional Hospital in South Boston (2013), and Sentara Albemarle Medical Center in Elizabeth City, North Carolina (2014). In March 2016, David Bernd stepped down as the system's CEO and was replaced by then president and COO, Howard P. Kern. Bernd had served as CEO since 1995 and had been at the company since 1972. Kern has been with Sentara since 1980.

In 2016, Sentara announced a $199 million expansion to its Norfolk General Hospital. In 2018, it announced a $93.5-million cancer center to be built in Norfolk, scheduled to be completed in 2020.

In August 2020, Sentara Healthcare and Greensboro, North Carolina-based Cone Health announced their intent to merge.

Operation
As of 2019, the Sentara Healthcare network includes 12 acute care hospitals, 10 nursing centers, and an assisted-living facility. It is Virginia's third-largest employer. It also operates more than 300 sites of care in Virginia and northeastern North Carolina with various outpatient facilities, home and hospice services, and its own health plan called Optima Health. Sentara also owns the Nightingale Regional Air Ambulance, a specialized helicopter equipped with cardiac and pulmonary equipment, like an intra-aortic balloon pump and 12-lead EKG monitor. It has successfully completed over 20,000 missions since its inception in 1982.

List of Sentara hospitals 
Sentara Albemarle Medical Center (Elizabeth City, NC)
Sentara Careplex Hospital (Hampton, VA)
Sentara Halifax Regional Hospital (South Boston, VA)
Sentara Heart Hospital (Norfolk, VA)
Sentara Lake Ridge (Lake Ridge, VA)
Sentara Leigh Hospital (Norfolk, VA)
Sentara Martha Jefferson Hospital (Charlottesville, VA)
Sentara Norfolk General Hospital (Norfolk, VA)
Sentara Northern Virginia Medical Center (Woodbridge, VA)
Sentara Obici Hospital (Suffolk, VA)
Sentara Princess Anne Hospital (Virginia Beach, VA)
Sentara RMH Medical Center (Harrisonburg, VA)
Sentara Virginia Beach General Hospital (Virginia Beach, VA)
Sentara Williamsburg Regional Medical Center (Williamsburg, VA)

References

External links
Official website

Hospital networks in the United States
Medical and health organizations based in Virginia
Companies based in Norfolk, Virginia
Health care companies based in Virginia
 
Healthcare in Virginia